is a 1977 Japanese film in Nikkatsu's Roman porno series, directed by Katsuhiko Fujii and starring Izumi Shima.

Synopsis
Mio is a young woman whose husband is a millionaire's son. When he becomes impotent following an automobile accident, she begins an affair with their gardener and chauffeur, Nitta. After her husband discovers Mio's infidelity, he forces her to leave.

Cast
 Izumi Shima
 Hiromi Maie
 Kenji Shiiya
 Yōko Azusa
 Teruho Matsunaga
 Naomi Oka

Critical appraisal
In their Japanese Cinema Encyclopedia: The Sex Films, the Weissers give Lady Chatterly in Tokyo a rating of two out of four. They contend that by changing the lead female character from the loyal wife with unsatisfied sexual needs, in Lawrence's original 1928 novel Lady Chatterley's Lover, Lady Chatterly in Tokyo removes the social and psychological conflict in the novel. "...all human interest", they write", "is missing from director Fujii's banal version. Instead, he merely offers a superficial adulterous story with little or no relationship to Lawrence's characters."

The film was not popular with the usual pink film and Roman Porno audience. It was advertised as a "love story", and proved surprisingly popular with female audiences, not the usual target for the Roman Porno series.

Availability
Lady Chatterley In Tokyo was released theatrically in Japan on August 20, 1977. It was released on VHS in Japan on May 25, 1989, and re-released in April 1995.

Bibliography

English
 "Lady Chatterley in Tokyo". Adam Film World October 1978, pp. 60–63.

Japanese

Notes

1977 films
Films based on Lady Chatterley's Lover
1970s Japanese-language films
Nikkatsu films
Nikkatsu Roman Porno
1970s Japanese films